Carlo Norway (born 1886) was an artist who worked in multiple mediums but specialised in lino-cuts and who was a member of the Decorative Art Group (founded 1916).

Norway studied at Colarossi's in Paris, and later at the Royal Academy in Dresden. He toured Europe. Norway was well known in London bohemian circles before the First World War and a customer at the Crab Tree Club. In 1919 he was subject to a coruscating review of his work at the Adelphi Gallery by Ezra Pound, being described as being in an "aggravated state of utter uncertainty, hoping to please everybody at once". In 1926 he exhibited at the Chester Gallery in London.

References

1886 births
British artists
Year of death missing
British expatriates in France
British expatriates in Germany